Messier 26, also known as NGC 6694, is an open cluster of stars in the southern constellation of Scutum. It was discovered by Charles Messier in 1764. This 8th magnitude cluster is a challenge to find in ideal skies with typical binoculars, where it can be, with any modern minimum  aperture device. About 25 stars are visible in a telescope with a  aperture.

The brightest star is of magnitude 11 and the age of this cluster has been calculated to be 85.3 million years. It includes one known spectroscopic binary system.

An interesting feature of M26 is a region of low star density near the nucleus. A hypothesis was that it was caused by an obscuring cloud of interstellar matter between us and the cluster, but a paper by James Cuffey suggested that this is not possible and that it really is a "shell of low stellar space density". In 2015, Michael Merrifield of the University of Nottingham said that there is, as yet, no clear explanation for the phenomenon.

Gallery

See also
 List of Messier objects

Footnotes and references

Footnotes

References

External links

 Messier 26, SEDS Messier pages
 

Messier 026
Carina–Sagittarius Arm
Messier 026
026
Messier 026
17640620